Semelai people are an Orang Asli people of the Proto-Malay people group found in Negeri Sembilan and Pahang states of Malaysia.

Settlement area
They are divided into two major groups, namely:-
 The Semelai people in Kampung Sungai Sampo and Kampung Sungai Lui, Jempol District, Negeri Sembilan
 The Semelai people in Pos Iskandar, Kampung Bukit Rok and Kampung Ibam, Tasik Bera, Kampung Bukit Gemuroh and Bongkok, Teriang, Bera District, Pahang

Population
The population of the changes of the Semelai population are as the following:-

The 2010 census, the Temoq people were included in the Semelai population due to the small numbers of Temoq people.

Music
The Semelai music have been passed down for generations except with little modification to suit with the modern times. There are two musical instruments used, which are the Rebana and Gong (including both "male" and "female" Gongs). This musical style is often performed in community halls or houses during feasts, weddings, circumcision ceremonies, gatherings and welcoming visitors for the purpose of entertainment. This music is performed with songs sung in Semelai language. There are also dances but it is only done with regulation and under certain requirements. The music of the Semelai is also used for healing purposes, such as singing in fertility ceremony.

References

External links 

 JOURNEY INTO TASEK BERA WITH THE ORANG ASLI SEMELAI

 More support for indigenous Semelai at Tasek Bera Ramsar Site

 Knowledge, Culture and Beliefs of Tasek Bera's Semelai People. Tasek Bera, Malaysia's first Ramsar site, is important not just for its flora and fauna. It is also home to the Semelai, the indigenous Orang Asli people who inhabit the area around the lake. WETLANDS INTERNATIONAL reports on their unique culture and beliefs.

Indigenous peoples of Southeast Asia
Ethnic groups in Malaysia
Orang Asli